Timothy John Homer (born  – 6 August 2017) was a New Zealand Radio Personality. His recent role in radio was assistant content director at The Sound. Homer had worked previously with ZM, Kiwi FM and More FM. Homer died unexpectedly on 6 August 2017.

References

1973 births
2017 deaths
New Zealand radio personalities